Alloclita xylodesma is a moth in the family Cosmopterigidae. It was described by Edward Meyrick in 1911. It is found in South Africa.

The forewings are dark fuscous, faintly purplish tinged. There is a moderately broad ochreous-white transverse fascia before one-third, partially edged with black and then with brown suffusion, the posterior edge angulated below the middle, the black marginal dots above and below this indicating the stigmata. A triangular ochreous-white spot is found on the costa at two-thirds, and an ochreous-white dot on the tornus, connected by a narrow brown fascia in which is a small black spot representing the second discal stigma. There is also an ochreous-white apical dot. The hindwings are dark grey.

References

Endemic moths of South Africa
Moths described in 1911
Antequerinae
Moths of Africa